William Hague Jr. (1836–1899) was  a well-known Irish Roman Catholic ecclesiastical architect active throughout mid- to late-nineteenth-century Ireland, particularly in Ulster. He is known as a protégé of A.W.N. Pugin. His office was located at 50 Dawson Street, Dublin.

He was born in County Cavan, the son of William Hague, a builder, and there designed several Roman Catholic churches, many in the French Gothic style. Hague died the year Omagh’s Sacred Heart was dedicated and consequently it was "a culmination of his amazing catalogue of completed ecclesiastical designs and his continuous championship of the Gothic Revival style," according to Richard Oram in Expressions of Faith-Ulster’s Church Heritage. Following his death, his partner T. F. McNamara took over most of his commissions under the firm name of Hague & McNamara.

Works
 Immaculate Conception Roman Catholic Church, Strabane (1890–1895)
 Sacred Heart Roman Catholic Church, Omagh (1892–1899), designed in the French Gothic style and built by the Colhoun Brothers of Derry at the contract price of £46,000.
 St. Eunan’s Cathedral, Letterkenny, County Donegal, completed by his partner T. F. McNamara following his death.
Ballyboy Catholic Church, County Cavan
Butlersbridge Catholic Church, County Cavan
Kingscourt Catholic Church, County Cavan
St. Macartan's Roman Catholic Cathedral, Monaghan, County Monaghan, (spire only, 1882–1892), County Monaghan
Swanlinbar Catholic Church, County Cavan
 St. Joseph's Roman Catholic Church, Park Street, Monaghan, County Monaghan (1900)
 Sacred Heart Roman Catholic Church, Carrickroe, Emyvale, County Monaghan (1823, enlarged 1885-1888 by Hague with date plaque of 1886)
 Church of Saint John the Evangelist, Kilkenny (1903-1908)
St Patrick's College, Cavan
 St. Brigid's Catholic Church, Killeshandra, Co. Cavan.
 St Patrick's Roman Catholic Church, Milltown, Co. Cavan
 Archbishops Palace, Drumcondra, Dublin 9.
 Sligo Townhall, Sligo, Co.Sligo
 Carlow Townhall, Carlow, Co. Carlow
 Church of the Sacred Heart, Aughrim, Co. Wicklow.
 St Rynagh's Catholic Church, Banagher, Co Offaly.

References

1836 births
1899 deaths
Irish ecclesiastical architects
Architects of Roman Catholic churches
People from County Cavan
Architects of cathedrals
19th-century Irish architects